Arnold Whittall (born 1935, Shrewsbury, Shropshire, England) is a British musicologist and writer. He is Professor Emeritus at King's College London. Between 1975 and 1996 he was Professor at King's. Previously he lectured at Cambridge, Nottingham (1964–1969) and Cardiff (1969–1975), where one of his students was Australian composer Norma Tyer.

Since the 1960s he has published books, articles and contributed chapters to multi-authored books.

Books
 Schoenberg Chamber Music. London: BBC, 1972.
 Music since the First World War. London : Dent, 1977.
 The Music of Britten and Tippett – Studies in Themes and Techniques. Cambridge: Cambridge University Press, 1982. (Second edition 1990)
 Romantic Music : a concise history from Schubert to Sibelius. London : Thames and Hudson, 1987.
 (Co-authored with Jonathan Dunsby) Music Analysis: In Theory and Practice. London : Faber, 1988.
 Musical composition in the twentieth century. Oxford : Oxford University Press, 1999.
 Jonathan Harvey. London : Faber, 1999.
 Exploring twentieth-century music : tradition and innovation. Cambridge : Cambridge University Press, 2003.
 The Cambridge introduction to serialism. Cambridge : Cambridge University Press, c2008.

References

External links
Emeritus staff and research fellows at King's College London

1935 births
Living people
Academics of King's College London
British musicologists
Britten scholars